Saint-Basile-le-Grand station is a commuter rail station operated by Exo in Saint-Basile-le-Grand, Quebec, Canada.

It is served by the Mont-Saint-Hilaire line.

Connecting bus routes

CIT de la Vallée du Richelieu

References

External links
  Saint-Basile-le-Grand Commuter Train Station Information (RTM)
  Saint-Basile-le-Grand Commuter Train Station Schedule (RTM)

Exo commuter rail stations
Railway stations in Montérégie
Railway stations in Canada opened in 2003
La Vallée-du-Richelieu Regional County Municipality
2003 establishments in Quebec